The Imperial Lighthouse Service was the official general lighthouse authority for the British Empire. This was with the exception of: England and Wales, the Channel Islands, Gibraltar and the Falkland Islands (all dealt with by Trinity House); Scotland and the Isle of Man (dealt with by the Northern Lighthouse Board); and Ireland (dealt with by the Commissioners of Irish Lights). The Imperial Lighthouse Service came under the control of the Board of Trade and was responsible for the provision and maintenance of navigational aids such as lighthouses, lightvessels, and buoys in all colonies of the British Empire. With the end of the British Empire most of these lighthouses were taken over by the newly independent countries and the Imperial Lighthouse Service stopped its operations by the late 1970s.

British Empire
Lighthouse organizations
Defunct public bodies of the United Kingdom